Gianluca Di Gennaro (born 11 February 1987) is an Italian footballer who plays as a goalkeeper.

Career
Born in San Felice a Cancello, Campania, southern Italy, Di Gennaro started his career at northern Italy side Torino. In mid-2005 after the old Torino was bankrupt and lost its promotion status, Di Gennaro left for Sampdoria along with Paolo Castellazzi and Pasquale Schiattarella. He finished as the runner-up of Campionato Nazionale Primavera as the backup of Vincenzo Fiorillo in June 2007.

On 18 August 2007 he was loaned to Swiss side Bellinzona. In mid-season he returned to Genoa and played in the Primavera (Spring) as overage player. This time he won the champion, again as backup. In the playoffs, he also played twice in the round of 16.

In the next season he was sold to Valenzana in co-ownership for a peppercorn fee of €500. Despite played 14 times in Lega Pro Seconda Divisione, Sampdoria gave up the remain 50% registration rights. Soon afterwards he was released.

On 10 August 2010 he returned to professional football. He was signed by Prima Divisione team Lumezzane as the backup of Matteo Trini.

References

External links
 
 Football.it Profile 
 Lumezzane Profile 

Italian footballers
Association football goalkeepers
Serie C players
Torino F.C. players
U.C. Sampdoria players
AC Bellinzona players
Valenzana Mado players
F.C. Lumezzane V.G.Z. A.S.D. players
Italian expatriate footballers
Expatriate footballers in Switzerland
Sportspeople from the Province of Caserta
1987 births
Living people
Footballers from Campania